Horst Birr (17 February 1912 – 8 October 1943) was a German actor. He appeared in more than 40 films between 1934 and 1941.  Birr was a member of the Nazi Party. There are different accounts about his death. Some sources state that he committed suicide with his wife Hertha Jische (Jicha, 1912–1943) once it became known he was half-Jewish.

Selected filmography

 Hearts are Trumps (1934)
 Playing with Fire (1934)
 Music in the Blood (1934)
 The Night With the Emperor (1936)
 The Abduction of the Sabine Women (1936)
 Savoy Hotel 217 (1936)
 Ride to Freedom (1937)
 Seven Slaps (1937)
  Napoleon Is to Blame for Everything (1938)
 The Impossible Mister Pitt (1938)
 Nanon (1938)
 The Stars Shine (1938)
 D III 88 (1939)
 Shoulder Arms (1939)
 The Fox of Glenarvon (1940)
 The Three Codonas (1940)

References

External links

1912 births
1943 suicides
Actors from Leipzig
German male film actors
Nazi Party members
Suicides by Jews during the Holocaust
German Jews who died in the Holocaust
20th-century German male actors
Suicides in Germany